Instat may refer to:
 InStat, sports performance analysis company.
 Institute of Statistics (Albania), the statistical agency.